Cisseps fulvicollis, the yellow-collared scape moth, is a species of the family Erebidae and subfamily Arctiinae. It was described by Jacob Hübner in 1818.

Description 
The wingspan is between 29 and 37 mm.

Distribution 
This moth is active during late spring and summer in fields and forest edges throughout Canada south to Texas and Florida.

Life cycle 
The caterpillar is yellow, brown or black with sparse long, soft, pale setae. It has dark stripes on its back and sides surrounded by yellow or orange stripes.

Larval foods 
 Grasses
 Sedges

Range 
It is widespread in North America, including the southeastern US, where the Virginia ctenucha (Ctenucha virginica) is absent.

Subspecies
Cisseps fulvicollis fulvicollis
Cisseps fulvicollis pallens (H. Edwards, 1886)

Similar species
Ctenucha virginica – Virginia ctenucha

Images

References

External links
 
 Cisseps fulvicollis, Lynn Scott's Lepidoptera Images
 Cisseps fulvicollis, Discover Life

Moths of North America
Ctenuchina